FC Cherepovets is an association football club from Cherepovets, Russia.

FC Sheksna last competed professionally in the Russian Second Division, West Zone in the 2011–12 season, dropping to amateur levels after that. The club changed its name from SeverStal Cherepovets in 2004. In 2012 it was reorganized as FC Cherepovets.

Club names
Metallurg (1956–1970) 
Stroitel (1979–1985) 
Khimik (1989–1990) 
Bulat (1991–1996) 
Severstal (2000–2004) 
Sheksna (2005–2012)
Aist (2012–2013)
Cherepovets – Aist (2013)
Cherepovets (2014 – )

External links
Old Official website 

Football clubs in Russia
Association football clubs established in 1912
Association football clubs established in 1956
Sport in Cherepovets
1912 establishments in the Russian Empire
1956 establishments in Russia